"That's My Baby" is a song co-written and recorded by American country music artist Lari White.  It was released in April 1994 as the first single from the album Wishes.  The song reached number 10 on the Billboard Hot Country Singles & Tracks chart.  It was written by White and Chuck Cannon.

Chart performance

References

1994 singles
Lari White songs
Songs written by Chuck Cannon
Song recordings produced by Garth Fundis
RCA Records singles
Music videos directed by Steven Goldmann
Songs written by Lari White
1994 songs